Kdol Tahen is a khum (commune) of Bavel District in Battambang Province in north-western Cambodia.

Former administration
27 villages as follows:

 Suon Sla
 Kdol Kraom
 San
 Peam
 Kandal
 Buor
 Thmei
 Tuol Krasang
 Kdol Leu
 Ta Haen
 Dom Nak Domkoa
 Trapeang Kbal Sva
 Boeng Anlok
 Brab Hoeb
 Sras Toeuk
 Anlong Rey
 Ta Toat
 Ou Doan Poa
 Khleang
 Chrang Bak
 Anlong Riang
 Boeung Sanke
 Tomnob Takoun
 Toul Snal
 Prey Thom
 Kampong Makak
 Bou Sangreach

References

Communes of Battambang province
Bavel District